Holtzhausen is a surname. Notable people with the surname include:

Deon Holtzhausen (born 1967), South African general
Maryka Holtzhausen (born 1987), South African netball player
Raymond Holtzhausen (born 1934), South African general